Bangalaia maublanci is a species of beetle in the family Cerambycidae. It was described by Villiers in 1938, originally under the genus Sternotomiella. It is known from Gabon. It contains the varietas Bangalaia maublanci var. postvittata.

References

Endemic fauna of Gabon
Prosopocerini
Beetles described in 1938